Valley Transit is a city bus and paratransit commission operated by the city government of Appleton, Wisconsin. It has operated as a bus system since 1930, and has been fully operated by the city since 1978.

The system operates across the Fox Cities and serves the cities of Appleton, Kaukauna, Menasha, and Neenah, as well as the towns of Buchanan and Grand Chute; and the villages of 
Fox Crossing, Darboy, Kimberly, and Little Chute. It connects with Oshkosh's GO Transit system via Route 10. Through an agreement with the Appleton Area School District. Valley Transit allows all students enrolled in an AASD middle/high school to ride the bus unlimited for free during the school year.

History
Public transportation in the area originated with streetcar systems, which operated from 1886 to 1930 when they were completely replaced by buses operated by a company called Fox River Bus Lines. Toward the end of the 1960s, the city began to subsidize the company, until it bought and took over operations on New Year's Day 1978.

Routes
Valley Transit's operations comprise 18 fixed bus routes all routes except #10 are roundtrip meaning they begin/end at the same place. In addition, they operate multiple seasonal (Tripper) routes which typically only run a limited number of times daily to connect most of the AASD middle/high schools to the Appleton Transit Center. Valley Transit also operates a paratransit service (contracted out to a local bus company), which shuttles elderly passengers from their homes to regular-route bus stops and functions much as a taxi service for disabled passengers. The company operates 25 buses between 6:15 AM and 10:30 PM on Weekdays, and 8:15 AM to 10:30 PM on Saturdays, with no service on Sundays.

Facilities

Terminals
 Appleton Transit Center - 100 E Washington St, Appleton, WI 54911 (Contains an indoor climate controlled waiting area with public washrooms. All routes except 10, 31, and 32 start/end here)
 North Transfer Point - Located behind the Northland Ave. Piggly Wiggly (Routes 5, 6, and 16 offer service)
 Neenah Transit Center - 141-199 West Doty Avenue (small booth at the corner of South Church Street and West Doty Avenue. Routes 10, 31, and 32 start/end here.)

Storage
 Valley Transit Operations Facility - 801 S Whitman Ave, Appleton, WI 54914 is a bus garage and maintenance facility. Valley Transit holds their offices/operations center here.

Fleet
Valley transit operates a fleet of 30 buses:

The Connector
A shared-ride taxi service operates during the hours of 4 AM until midnight Monday through Saturday that connects public transit users with jobs. This service requires advance reservations but allows users in remote or newly developed areas of the Fox Cities get to and from work.

Ridership

See also
 GO Transit (Wisconsin) Bus service serving Oshkosh, Wisconsin
 Green Bay Metro Bus service serving the Green Bay, Wisconsin Area
 Appleton Transit Center
 List of bus transit systems in the United States
 List of intercity bus stops in Wisconsin

References

External links

 The Connector Website

Bus transportation in Wisconsin
Transportation in Winnebago County, Wisconsin
Transportation in Calumet County, Wisconsin
Transportation in Outagamie County, Wisconsin
Appleton, Wisconsin
1930 establishments in Wisconsin